Sadashivrao Bapuji Thakre (14 June 1925 - 9 June 2020) was an Indian politician. He was elected to the Maharashtra Legislative Assembly from Yavatmal, Maharashtra as a member of the Indian National Congress.

References

External links
https://marathi.latestly.com/maharashtra/former-mp-sadashivrao-bapuji-thackeray-passes-away-in-yavatmal-140612.html

https://www.lokmat.com/yavatmal/former-mp-sadashivrao-thackeray-passes-away-a301/

People from Maharashtra